The Golden Horde is a 1951 American historical adventure film directed by George Sherman and starring Ann Blyth, David Farrar, with George Macready, Richard Egan and Peggie Castle. Many of the exterior scenes were shot in the Death Valley National Park in California. It was made using Technicolor, and was one of a series of color films in exotic setting released by Universal around this time.

Plot
In 1220, Sir Guy of Devon (David Farrar) and a small band of English crusaders arrive at Samarkand in Central Asia. The  city and its ruling princess Shalimar (Ann Blyth) are threatened by Genghis Khan (Marvin Miller) and his hordes. Shalimar hopes to defeat the conqueror by guile, whilst Sir Guy prefers to put up  a brave (if ultimately futile) fight.  Despite the mutual attraction between Shalimar and Sir Guy, their differing methods threaten any hope either may have of victory.

Main cast
Ann Blyth as Princess Shalimar
David Farrar as Sir Guy of Devon
George Macready as Raven the Shaman
Richard Egan as Gill
Peggie Castle as Lailee
Henry Brandon as Juchi, son of Genghis Khan
Howard Petrie as Tuglik
Marvin Miller as Genghis Khan
Donald Randolph as Torga
 Poodles Hanneford as Friar John

See also
Golden Horde
List of historical drama films of Asia

Bibliography
 Kevin J. Harty. The Reel Middle Ages: American, Western and Eastern European, Middle Eastern and Asian Films About Medieval Europe. McFarland, 1999.

References

External links
 

1951 films
1950s historical adventure films
American historical adventure films
Universal Pictures films
Films set in the 13th century
Films directed by George Sherman
Films set in Samarkand
Depictions of Genghis Khan on film
Films scored by Hans J. Salter
1950s English-language films
1950s American films